= Telaga Dringo =

Crater lake located in Sumatra, Indonesia

Lake Dringo
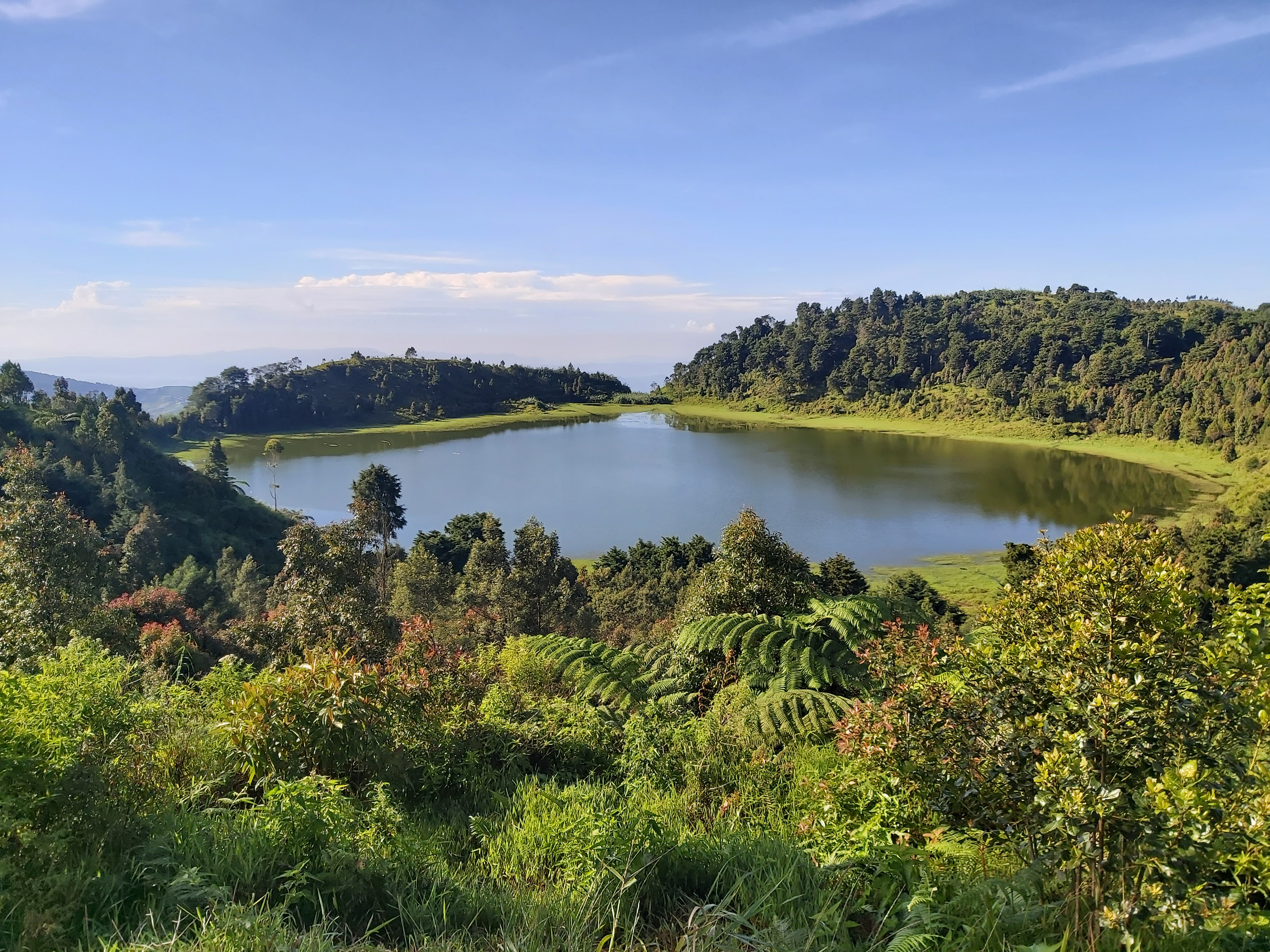
- A view of Lake Dringo

- Location within Indonesia Location within Java
- Location: Central Java, Indonesia
- Coordinates: 7.18667°S 109.84778°E
- Type: Volcanic/tectonic
- Basin countries: Indonesia
- Max. length: 330 m (1,080 ft)
- Max. width: 330 m (1,080 ft)
- Surface elevation: 2,028 m (6,654 ft)
- Settlements: Pekasiran, Batur, Banjarnegara

Lake Dringo (Indonesian: Telaga Dringo; also called Sedringo or Sendringo) is a volcanic crater lake located in Pekasiran, Batur, Banjarnegara, Central Java, Indonesia. It was formed from the eruption of Dringo volcano in 1786.

== Geology ==
Dringo Volcano was formed during the post-caldera I period, which is about 1 - 2 million years ago, as a part of the Dieng Volcanic Complex in the Batur depression region. The Dringo Volcano was built up mostly of intermediate composition and pyroxene andesite.

Lake Dringo is the site of Dringo volcano eruption, indicated by the pyroclastic flows breccia outcrops around the lake which are generally found in a weathered weathered, brown, and altered conditions. The breccia fragments consist of pyroxene andesite: plagioclase, pyroxene, opaque minerals, and glass as groundmass.
